St Stephen of the Abyssinians is an Ethiopian Catholic church located in Vatican City. The church dedicated to Stephen the Protomartyr is the national church of Ethiopia. The liturgy is celebrated according to the Alexandrian rite of the Ethiopian Catholic Church. It is one of the only standing structures in the Vatican to survive the destruction of Old St. Peter's Basilica (c. 1505), and thus it is the oldest surviving church (in terms of architectural history) in Vatican City.

History
The church was, by tradition, built by Pope Leo I (ca. 400–461), and named Santo Stefano Maggiore.

In 1479, Pope Sixtus IV restored the church and assigned it to the Coptic monks in the city. It was at this time that the name was changed to reflect that it was served by Ethiopians (Abyssinians). Situated behind Saint Peter's Basilica, Santo Stefano had long been associated with the Ethiopian diaspora.  To Italians, it was known as Santo Stefano dei Mori (Moors), degli Indiani (Indians), and degli Abissini. To Ethiopians, it was Däbrä Qeddus Esṭifanos, or the Mount of Saint Stephen. By the 1530s, it was the most famous community of free Africans in Europe and Leo Africanus referred to it in his Descrittione dell'Africa (1550), describing "certain religious who are friars and have their faces branded; they can be seen throughout Europe but especially in Rome." The most notable Abyssinian monk at St. Stephens was Abba Täsfa Ṣeyon, also known as Pietro Abissino, a monk of Shewan origin who had served in the royal court of Dawit II. "The peak of Santo Stefano's intellectual influence was the mid-16th century, for it was in this period that Täsfa Ṣǝyon, who'd arrived in Rome by 1536 and died there in 1552, tirelessly disseminated knowledge of Ethiopian language and culture."

It was altered under Pope Clement XI (1700–1721), and again in 1928.

Exterior
The façade is in the style of the early 18th century. The 12th century doorway, decorated with the Lamb and the Cross, has been preserved.

Interior
The church has a single nave with ancient columns along the sides. The most important work of art is a fresco of the Madonna with Child in the Roman style from the 15th century.

Liturgy
The Feast of St. Stephen is celebrated on 26 December.

See also
 Index of Vatican City-related articles

Notes

References

 
 
 

9th-century churches in Italy
Churches in Vatican City
Ethiopian diaspora in Europe
National churches in Rome